Euser is a surname. Notable people with the surname include:

Cor Euser (born 1957), Dutch racing driver
Dan Euser, Canadian artist, sculptor, designer, and landscape architect
Lucas Euser (born 1983), American cyclist

See also
Eser (name)